Yam Hain Hum is an Indian fantasy situation comedy on SAB TV. It starred Manav Gohil, Atul Parchure, Fenil Umrigar and Debina Bonnerjee.

In his home in Yamlok, Yamraj, the god of death, discovers that the people on Earth misunderstand him as a scary villain who takes away lives. Determined to show everyone that he has a good soul, Yam descends to Delhi from Heaven with Chitragupt, the god who tracks whether the deeds humans do during their life are good or bad.

Cast

Main

Manav Gohil as Yamraj
Fenil Umrigar/Debina Bonnerjee as Dhurmona
Atul Parchure as Chitragupta

Recurring

Indresh Malik as Baldev Kapoor
Rini Chandra as Riya Chaudhary
Ashcharya Shetty as Bindiya Kapoor 
Farhina Parvez as Shikha Kapoor
Anirudh Dave as Laalu Singh/Bhayyaji
Raju Kher as Papaji/Satyajeet Kapoor
Raanveer Chahal as Kishore insurance
Niharika Kundra as Manju Chaudhary
Alekh Sangal as Chaman
Aashutosh semwal as Rohit 
Perneet Chauhan as Jhelo 
Sunayana Fozdar as Monika
Neyha Sharma as Divya
Deepshikha Nagpal as Badi Bindu
Vikas Grover as Chunky
 Piya Chaubey  as Tina
 Rocky Verma as Director
 Jitender Singh Chaudhary as Jewellery Thief
Samiksha Bhatnagar as Parampara
 Jiten Mukhi  as College Principal
 Fenil Umrigar as Sridevi / Dhumorna
 Tiao Sadhil Kapoor  as Chota Narad 
Simple Kaul as  Iravati Shobhavati
Kajal Jain as Nandini Shobhavati
 V.I.P. Comedian as himself
Rajkumar Kanojia   as Fake Blind Man
Vijay D Baldani as Narada
Navina Bole as Meneka

References 

2014 Indian television series debuts
Hindi-language television shows
Indian fantasy television series
Indian television series about Hindu deities
Indian television sitcoms
Sony SAB original programming
Television about magic
Television series about shapeshifting
Television series set in the 2010s
Television shows set in Delhi
Swastik Productions television series